South Africa first participated at the Olympic Games in 1904, and sent athletes to compete in every Summer Olympic Games until 1960.  After the passage of United Nations General Assembly Resolution 1761 in 1962 in response to South Africa's policy of apartheid, the nation was barred from the Games.

After the negotiations to end apartheid in South Africa commenced in 1990, the nation re-joined the Olympic movement.  The South African Sports Confederation and Olympic Committee was created in 1991, and South Africa returned to the Games at the 1992 Summer Olympics (and the 1992 Summer Paralympics).  South Africa also participated in the Winter Olympic Games in 1960, and since 1994.

South African athletes have won a total of 89 medals, with athletics, boxing, and swimming as the top medal-producing sports.

History

South African athletes first participated in the 1904 Summer Olympics in St. Louis, when few foreign athletes arrived and the organisers invited participants of the adjacent 1904 World's Fair to compete. General Piet Cronjé, Len Taunyane, and Jan Mashiani, all Boer War veterans who had been taken prisoner by the British at St. Helena after the Battle of Paardeberg and had reenacted battle scenes at the fair, participated in the men's marathon. Len Taunyane and Jan Mashiani were the first black Africans to participate in the Olympics, and the only blacks to represent South Africa in the Olympics until the end of apartheid.

Although the four British colonies of Cape of Good Hope, Natal, Transvaal, and Orange River did not form the Union of South Africa until 1910, they fielded a combined South Africa team at the 1908 Summer Olympics in London, where Reggie Walker won its first gold medal. The first South African woman in the Olympics was swimmer Barbara Nash in 1920, and the first women to win medals were the 1928  4 × 100 metre freestyle relay quartet, who came third.  The South African Olympic and Empire Games Association was awarded the 1934 British Empire Games in Johannesburg but backed out when it became evident that they would have to allow a team from India to compete.

South Africa first entered the Winter Olympics in 1960, and that summer's games in Rome would be its last till the end of apartheid. It was not invited to the 1964 Games, and its 1968 invitation was withdrawn when other teams threatened to withdraw. The South African Olympic and National Games Association was expelled from the International Olympic Committee (IOC) in 1970.

The nonracial Interim National Olympic Committee of South Africa (now South African Sports Confederation and Olympic Committee) was founded in 1991 during the transition to multiracial equality and affiliated to the IOC months later. The country returned at the 1992 Summer Olympics in Barcelona.

Medal tables

Medals by Summer Games

Medals by Winter Games

Medals by sport

List of medalists

See also
 List of flag bearers for South Africa at the Olympics
 :Category:Olympic competitors for South Africa
 South Africa at the Paralympics

References

External links